Vita is a feminine given name derived from the Latin word meaning life. In other instances it has been used as a diminutive of names such as Victoria or as a feminine form of the related masculine name Vitus and its masculine and feminine variants. It has been in general use since the 1800s.

Usage
The name was among the ten most popular names for newborn girls in Slovenia in 2021.

People

Given name
Vita (rapper) (born 1976), stage name of American rapper
Vita Anda Tērauda (born 1962), Latvian politician
Vita Buivid (born 1962), Russian contemporary artist
Vita Chambers (born 1993),  Barbadian-Canadian singer and songwriter
Vita Gollancz (1926 – 2009), British painter
Vita Heine (born 1984), Norwegian racing cyclist
Vita Kin (born 1969), Ukrainian fashion designer
Vita Kuktienė (born 1980), Lithuanian basketball player
Vita Marissa (born 1981), retired badminton player from Indonesia
Vita Matīse (born 1972), Latvian windsurfer
Vita Mavrič, Slovene singer
Vita Nel (born 1975), South African beach volleyballer 
Vita Nikolaenko (born 1995), Belarusian footballer
Vita Sackville-West (1892–1962), English author and poet
Vita Sidorkina (born 1994), Russian model
Vita Silchenko (born 1967), Belarusian fencer
Vita Zubchenko (born 1989), Ukrainian rhythmic gymnast

Surname
Alessio Vita (born 1993), Italian footballer
Carol Vita, American politician
Claudine Vita (born 1996), German athlete
Lucas Vita (born 1985), Brazilian water polo player

References